Olesya Yuriyevna Vladykina (born 14 February 1988) is a Paralympic swimmer from Russia competing mainly in category SB8 events.

Vladykina competed in the 2008 Summer Paralympics in Beijing. She won gold in the 100m Breaststroke, setting a new world record time. She also finished fourth in the 200m individual medley.

Career
Vladykina started swimming at Young People's Olympic Reserve Sports School 47 and practiced the sport professionally for 10 years until her entrance to Moscow State University of Railway Engineering, when she concentrated on her studies, leaving active swimming for a year until her injury.

She lost her left arm when she and some friends were in Thailand on holiday and their touring bus overturned; she also suffered the loss of her best friend in the accident. She resumed training a month after she was released from the hospital, and five months later she won the Beijing Paralympic final.

References

External links
 

Paralympic swimmers of Russia
Swimmers at the 2008 Summer Paralympics
Paralympic gold medalists for Russia
Russian female breaststroke swimmers
Russian female freestyle swimmers
Russian female medley swimmers
Swimmers from Moscow
1988 births
Living people
Swimmers at the 2012 Summer Paralympics
Medalists at the 2008 Summer Paralympics
Medalists at the 2012 Summer Paralympics
S8-classified Paralympic swimmers
Paralympic silver medalists for Russia
Medalists at the World Para Swimming Championships
Medalists at the World Para Swimming European Championships
Paralympic medalists in swimming
20th-century Russian women
21st-century Russian women